The Shankai Classic, known for sponsorship reasons as the Shankai Classic presented by IDG, was a golf tournament on the Challenge Tour. It was first played in October 2014 at Chongqing Poly Golf Club in Chongqing, China.

Winners

Notes

References

External links
Coverage on the Challenge Tour's official site

Former Challenge Tour events
Golf tournaments in China
Sport in Chongqing
Recurring sporting events established in 2014